Fordell may refer to:
 Fordell Castle, a restored 16th-century tower house in Fife, Scotland
 John Henderson, 5th of Fordell (1605–1650)
 Mount Fordell, a mountain in Antarctica
 Fordell, New Zealand, a settlement in the Whanganui District